Granite Quarry may refer to:

 Granite Quarry, North Carolina
 Granite Quarry, Wisconsin

See also
 Granite
 Quarry